John Bridgwater FREng (10 January 1938 - May 2021) was a Shell Professor of Chemical Engineering at the University of Cambridge.

Life
Bridgwater was born 10 January 1938 and went to Solihull School. He gained a BA in chemical engineering at St Catharine's College, Cambridge in 1959, an MSE in chemical engineering at Princeton University in 1961. He then worked for Courtaulds before returning to Cambridge, becoming a lecturer in 1964 and obtaining a PhD in 1973.

In 1980 he took up a post as professor in the School of Chemical Engineering at the University of Birmingham, becoming Head of Department from 1983 to 1989, and Dean of the Faculty from 1989-1992.  In 1993 he took up the position of Shell Professor of Chemical Engineering at Cambridge, which he held until his retirement in 2004, being also Head of Department from 1993 to 1998. Upon his retirement a symposium was held to celebrate his achievements, particularly in research into particle science, where he had authored some 200 papers.

He died in May 2021.

Honours
Bridgwater was a Fellow of the Royal Academy of Engineering from 1987 and President of the Institution of Chemical Engineers for 1997-8.  He was an Emeritus Professor of the Department of Chemical Engineering and Biotechnology of the University of Cambridge.

References

1938 births
2021 deaths
Chemical engineering professors at the University of Cambridge
British chemical engineers
Fellows of the Royal Academy of Engineering
Alumni of St Catharine's College, Cambridge
Princeton University School of Engineering and Applied Science alumni
Academics of the University of Birmingham
People educated at Solihull School